Reliability, reliable, or unreliable may refer to:

Science, technology, and mathematics

Computing
 Data reliability (disambiguation), a property of some disk arrays in computer storage
 High availability
 Reliability (computer networking), a category used to describe protocols
 Reliability (semiconductor), outline of semiconductor device reliability drivers

Other uses in science, technology, and mathematics
 Reliability (statistics), the overall consistency of a measure
 Reliability engineering, concerned with the ability of a system or component to perform its required functions under stated conditions for a specified time
 High reliability is informally reported in "nines"
 Human reliability in engineered systems
 Reliability theory, as a theoretical concept, to explain biological aging and species longevity

Other uses
 Reliabilism, in philosophy and epistemology.
 Unreliable narrator, whose credibility has been seriously compromised.
 Discrediting anything in a debate

See also
 
 
 
 Reliant (disambiguation)